There are 69 sites in the National Register of Historic Places listings in West Side, Chicago, out of more than 350 listings in the City of Chicago. The West Side is defined for this article as the area north of the Chicago Sanitary and Ship Canal, south of Fullerton Avenue, west of the Chicago River and east of the western city limits. One site, Logan Square Boulevards Historic District, spans a border and is included also in listings on the North Side. The Chicago Sanitary and Ship Canal Historic District extends through Cook County west of Chicago, DuPage County and Will County to Lockport.

West Side Chicago listings on the National Register
The listed properties are distributed across 9 of the 77 well-defined community areas of Chicago.

|}

Former listing

|}

Key

See also
List of Chicago Landmarks
List of Registered Historic Places in Illinois
List of National Historic Landmarks in Illinois
National Register of Historic Places listings in Central Chicago
National Register of Historic Places listings in North Side Chicago
National Register of Historic Places listings in South Side Chicago

References

External links

Chicago Listing on the National Register of Historic Places (2011)
NPS−National Park Service: Focus database.

West

Chicago-related lists